The Wreck is a surf spot located at Byron Bay, New South Wales, Australia.

Background
The Wreck is named for the remains of the SS Wollongbar lodged just offshore. The ship lost its tie to the old Byron Bay Pier during a cyclone in 1922 and sank. On the eastern end of the Wreck one can see the rudder tiller and at low tide one can see the boilers.

The Wreck is best surfed on mid-high tide with a W - SE wind, on a N/NE swell of 3 to 6 feet.

References

External links
 Photos of Perfect Surf at 'The Wreck Byron Bay'

Surfing locations in New South Wales